Vinton is an unincorporated community in Plumas County, California.

For census purposes, Vinton is included in the census-designated place (CDP) of Chilcoot-Vinton.

The Vinton post office opened in 1897. The name honors Vinton Bowen, daughter of a Sierra Valley Railway official.

The Sierra Valley Grange #466 organized in 1931. The grange has hosted many weddings, funerals, 4-H meetings, dinners and dances. In 1986 it became home to the Vinton Cowboy Poetry show, second show to Elko.

References

Unincorporated communities in California
Unincorporated communities in Plumas County, California